In mathematics, a quasi-projective variety in algebraic geometry is a locally closed subset of a projective variety, i.e., the intersection inside some projective space of a Zariski-open and a Zariski-closed subset. A similar definition is used in scheme theory, where a quasi-projective scheme is a locally closed subscheme of some projective space.

Relationship to affine varieties

An affine space is a Zariski-open subset of a projective space, and since any closed affine subset  can be expressed as an intersection of the projective completion  and the affine space embedded in the projective space, this implies that any affine variety is quasiprojective. There are locally closed subsets of projective space that are not affine, so that quasi-projective is more general than affine. Taking the complement of a single point in projective space of dimension at least 2 gives a non-affine quasi-projective variety. This is also an example of a quasi-projective variety that is neither affine nor projective.

Examples

Since quasi-projective varieties generalize both affine and projective varieties, they are sometimes referred to simply as varieties. Varieties isomorphic to affine algebraic varieties as quasi-projective varieties are called affine varieties; similarly for projective varieties. For example, the complement of a point in the affine line, i.e., is isomorphic to the zero set of the polynomial  in the affine plane. As an affine set  is not closed since any polynomial zero on the complement must be zero on the affine line. For another example, the complement of any conic in projective space of dimension 2 is affine. Varieties isomorphic to open subsets of affine varieties are called quasi-affine.

Quasi-projective varieties are locally affine in the same sense that a manifold is locally Euclidean: every point of a quasi-projective variety has a neighborhood which is an affine variety. This yields a basis of affine sets for the Zariski topology on a quasi-projective variety.

See also 
Abstract algebraic variety, often synonymous with "quasi-projective variety".
divisorial scheme, a generalization of a quasi-projective variety

Citations

References 

 

Algebraic varieties